Jessica Wilen Berg is an American attorney  and specialist in Public Health (MPH), currently serving as co-Dean at Case Western Reserve University School of Law, the first female co-Dean or Dean in the law school's 129-year history. She is also Tom J.E. and Bette Lou Walker Professor of Law,Professor in the Departments of Bioethics, and of Population and Quantitative Health Sciences at the CWRU School of Medicine. She is a reference book author in the area of informed consent.  Her scholarly opinion is often reported by institutions and media on ethical aspects iof innovative biomedical procedures.

Education 

Berg graduated as a Bachelor of Arts from Cornell University in 1991. In 1994, she graduated as Juris Doctor (JD) from Cornell Law School. She undertook consecutive positions as a fellow at the Institute for Law, Psychiatry and Public Policy at the University of Virginia School of Law (1994), fellow at the Center for Biomedical Ethics, University of Virginia School of Medicine (1994), and Scholar in Excellence at the University of Massachusetts School of Medicine (1996-1996). In 2009 she completed a Masters in Public Health (MPH) at Case Western Reserve University School of Medicine.

Career 

Berg taught at several law schools in the US. She was  a Fellow at the Center for Biomedical Ethics and the Institute for Law, Psychiatry and Public Policy at the University of Virginia (1994), and a Scholar in Excellence at the University of Massachusetts Medical School (1995 - 1996).

In 1999 she became assistant professor at Case Western University School of Law, where she has successively been Associate Professor (2003), Professor of Law, Bioethics and Public Health (2005–present),  Tom J.E. and Bette Lou Walker Professor of Law (2014 to date)/ She is also associate director of the Institute for Global Security Law & Policy (2006 - 2007),  associate director of the Law-Medicine Center (2006 - 2014), and co-Dean (2013 - present), together with professor Michael Scharf.

She was Director of Academic Affairs and member of the working group on Healthcare Organizational Ethics of the Institute for Ethics and Emerging Technologies, and Secretary of the Council on Ethical and Judicial Affairs for the American Medical Association. As part of an academic group with Max Mehlman and others, in 2006 she was a recipient of a large NIH research grant to develop guidelines for the use of human subjects in genetic research. In 2008, Berg was named Health Policy Researcher of the Year by the Health Policy Institute of Ohio, and she received the Case Western Reserve University Mather Spotlight Award for Excellence in Research in 2009.

Works

Papers 
Her most-cited   academic articles  are:

 Wynia, M. K.; Latham, S. R.; Kao, A. C.; Berg, J. W.; Emanuel, L. L. (1999-11-18). "Medical professionalism in society". The New England Journal of Medicine. 341 (21): 1612–1616. doi:10.1056/NEJM199911183412112. ISSN 0028-4793. PMID 10577119 
 Berg, J. W.; Appelbaum, P. S.; Grisso, T. (1996). "Constructing competence: formulating standards of legal competence to make medical decisions". Rutgers Law Review. 48 (2): 345–371. ISSN 0036-0465. PMID 16086484 
 Doukas, D. J.; Berg, J. W. (2001). "The family covenant and genetic testing". The American journal of bioethics: AJOB. 1 (3): 3–10. doi:10.1162/152651601750417784. ISSN 1526-5161. PMID 11954587

Books 
 

The book has been recommended as a professional reference source on the theory and practice of informed consent,

References 

Living people
Cornell University alumni
Case Western Reserve University faculty
Deans of law schools in the United States
American women non-fiction writers
Year of birth missing (living people)